The 2020 Kilkenny Senior Hurling Championship was the 126th staging of the Kilkenny Senior Hurling Championship since its establishment by the Kilkenny County Board in 1887. The championship began on 29 August 2020 and ended on 27 September 2020.

Ballyhale Shamrocks were the defending champions. Danesfort were relegated after suffering a 1-15 to 1-13 defeat by Graigue-Ballycallan in a playoff.

On 27 September 2020, Ballyhale Shamrocks won the championship after a 5-19 to 1-10 defeat of Dicksboro in the final at UPMC Nowlan Park. It was their 18th championship title overall and their third title in succession.

Team changes

To Championship

Promoted from the Kilkenny Intermediate Hurling Championship
 Tullaroan

From Championship

Relegated to the Kilkenny Intermediate Hurling Championship
 St. Patrick's Ballyragget

Fixtures/results

First round

Relegation playoffs

Quarter-finals

Semi-finals

Final

References

External link

 Kilkenny GAA website

Kilkenny Senior Hurling Championship
Kilkenny Senior Hurling Championship
Kilkenny Senior Hurling Championship